The National Information Network (NIN) (Persian: شبکۀ ملی اطلاعات, Shabake-ye Melli-ye Ettelā'āt), also known as National Internet in Iran and the Iranian intranet, is an ongoing project to develop a secure, stable infrastructure network and national intranet in Iran.

The Supreme Council of Cyberspace of Iran defines the NIN as "a network based on the Internet Protocol with switches and routers and data centers which allows for data requests to avoid being routed outside of the country and provides secure and private intranet networks."

The idea of a national intranet was developed at the Ministry of Information and Communication Technology in 2005, and the project started in 2013. It is based on the Fifth Economic Development Plan of Iran.

The Iranian government allocated about $200 million to develop NIN infrastructures alongside NIN e-content. Iranian president Hassan Rouhani signed an engineering program in September 2020. According to the Iranian government, one of the NIN's main objectives is to break the monopoly of the Internet.

Cisco Systems routers and switches were deprecated because of the program. It has full independence.

Deployment

The National Information Network's two main parts are:
 A public sector for delivering NIN services to public and business users
 A private sector for delivering NIN services to governmental users.

Everyone is identified by their social ID and telephone numbers before being able to access the network. The Iranian government fully implemented the NIN between 15 and 27 November 2019, during the 2019 Internet blackout in Iran.

Corporations are required to use only Iranian data centers and register their IP address.

NIN can be used similar to the Great Firewall.

In 2019, Mohammad Ali Movahedi Kermani in Tehran declared in a Friday prayer that Telegram is haram and requested the NIN to be implemented.

Further reading
ICT Infrastructure (National Information Network) in capable delivery of content in Iran and exemplary countries

See also 
 Communications in Iran#Internet
 Censorship in Iran
 Internet censorship in Iran 
 2019 Internet blackout in Iran
 National knowledge network

References

External links 
http://irnin.ito.gov.ir/
Information Technology Organization
https://samandehi.ir/

Internet in Iran